Ali Asghar Rahmani Khalili ( Persian : علی اصغر رحمانی خلیلی ) born 1944 in Behshahr was the representative of Behshahr, Neka and Galougah constituencies in the first, second and sixth term of the Islamic Parliament of Iran. In the first round, he was elected to replace Ahmad Tavakoli in the midterm elections. He was the parliamentary deputy of Seyyed Mohammad Khatami during his tenure in the Ministry of Culture and Guidance. He is a member of the Association of Combatant Clerics and Assembly of the Forces of Imam's Line.

References

1944 births
People from Behshahr
Members of the 1st Islamic Consultative Assembly
Members of the 2nd Islamic Consultative Assembly
Members of the 6th Islamic Consultative Assembly
Association of Combatant Clerics politicians
Assembly of the Forces of Imam's Line politicians
Living people